Anaches is a genus of longhorn beetles of the subfamily Lamiinae, containing the following species:

 Anaches dorsalis (Pascoe, 1858)
 Anaches semicylindricus (Hayashi, 1974)
 Anaches wenhsini Holzschuh & Lin, 2013
 Anaches yitingi Holzschuh & Lin, 2013

References

Pteropliini
Cerambycidae genera